"Paparazzi" is a song by Xzibit, issued as the lead single from his debut album At the Speed of Life. The song's official music video was directed by Michael Lucero.

The songs samples Barbra Streisand's "Pavane (Vocalise)", itself a version of Gabriel Fauré's Pavane.

The song is used for the soundtrack of Tony Hawk's Pro Skater 3. The instrumental version of "Paparazzi" was used to close "Pax Soprana", the sixth episode of the first season of The Sopranos.

Charts

Weekly charts

Year-end charts

Certifications

References 

1995 songs
1996 debut singles
Loud Records singles
Music videos directed by Michael Lucero
Xzibit songs
Songs written by Xzibit